Luis Aguilar (born January 29, 1984) is an American former soccer player who last played as a defender for Montreal Impact in the USL First Division.

Career 
Aguilar graduated from La Mirada High School.  He attended Rio Hondo College for two years, playing on the men's soccer team in 2002 and 2003.  He was a 2002 2007 NSCAA/adidas Men’s Junior College Division III All-America.  In 2004, Aguilar transferred to the University of San Francisco.  He completed his collegiate career in 2005 after winning back-to-back WCC Division I titles with Second and First Team All-WCC awards.  In March 2005, Aguilar joined the Ajax Orlando Prospects of the USL Premier Development League.  Aguilar was drafted by the California Cougars of Major Indoor Soccer League in March 2006. Aguilar played with the San Francisco Seals.  He later played for the Ajax Orlando Prospects.  In 2007, he signed with the USL First Division expansion team California Victory. He played nineteen games with the Victory before being traded to the Montreal Impact on July 30, 2007.  He then played seven games with the Impact through the end of the 2007 season that includes making the starting squad for the playoffs. He was signed to a 3-year contract extension with the Impact and played through the first half of the 2008 season until an injury caused him to retire early. He currently resides in San Francisco.

External links
Player Profile at the Montreal Impact website
Article involving his move to the Montreal Impact

References

1984 births
Living people
Ajax Orlando Prospects players
American expatriate sportspeople in Canada
American expatriate soccer players
American people of Ecuadorian descent
California Victory players
Expatriate soccer players in Canada
Association football defenders
Montreal Impact (1992–2011) players
San Francisco Dons men's soccer players
Soccer players from Long Beach, California
Sportspeople of Ecuadorian descent
USL First Division players
USL League Two players
American soccer players